Parcheh Qeshlaq (also Romanized as Pārcheh Qeshlāq) is a village in Qeshlaq Rural District, in the Central District of Ahar County, East Azerbaijan Province, Iran. At the 2006 census, its population was 126, in 23 families.

References 

Populated places in Ahar County